Jos Bernard (26 April 1924 – 26 January 2020) was a Luxembourgian gymnast who competed in the 1948 Summer Olympics. He was born in Cologne in April 1924 and died in January 2020 at the age of 95.

References

1924 births
2020 deaths
Gymnasts at the 1948 Summer Olympics
Luxembourgian male artistic gymnasts
Olympic gymnasts of Luxembourg
Sportspeople from Cologne